Eucithara gradata is a small sea snail, a marine gastropod mollusk in the family Mangeliidae.

Distribution
This marine species is found off Western India and Sri Lanka.

Description
The length of the shell attains 5.75 mm, its diameter 2.5 mm.

The ribs are narrow, straight, and continue to the base of the body whorl. The interstices are regularly transversely striated. The columella is almost straight, slightly rugose above,. The outer lip is nearly straight, very thick, regularly rounded. The color of the shell is pure white.

References

 Nevill, G. & Nevill, H. 1875. Descriptions of nine marine Mollusca from the Indian Ocean. 1. Asiatic Soc. Bengal [n.s.] 44(2): 8~104, pis 7,8.

External links
  Tucker, J.K. 2004 Catalog of recent and fossil turrids (Mollusca: Gastropoda). Zootaxa 682:1-1295
 Kilburn R.N. 1992. Turridae (Mollusca: Gastropoda) of southern Africa and Mozambique. Part 6. Subfamily Mangeliinae, section 1. Annals of the Natal Museum, 33: 461–575

gradata
Gastropods described in 1875